Vernon A. Bullard (October 14, 1858 - September 8, 1928) was a Vermont attorney and public official.  He was notable for his service as United States Attorney for the District of Vermont from 1916 to 1923.

Bullard was a native of Hyde Park, Vermont, and taught school while completing his education at Vermont Normal School and the University of Michigan Law School.  He practiced law beginning in 1884, first in Underhill and later in Burlington.

A Democrat, Bullard served terms in the Vermont House of Representatives, and ran unsuccessfully for offices including Vermont Attorney General.  From 1915 to 1923, Bullard served as Vermont's U.S. Attorney.

Bullard died in Burlington and was buried at Riverbank Cemetery, Stowe, Vermont.

Early life
Vernon Alvord Bullard was born in Hyde Park, Vermont on October 14, 1858, the eldest son of Edwin and Olive (Harrington) Bullard.  He was educated in Hyde Park, and began to teach school in 1878.  While teaching, Bullard attended the Vermont Normal School, from which he graduated in 1880.

Bullard continued to teach while taking courses at the University of Michigan Law School, from which he received his LL.B. in 1884.  He was admitted to the bar later that year and commenced practice in Underhill.

Early career
After practicing in Underhill for ten years, Bullard relocated to Burlington, where he continued to practice.  Bullard successfully handled several prominent criminal trials and earned a reputation as a skilled lawyer in civil cases, winning several judgments for medical malpractice.

Bullard was active in politics as a Democrat during an era when Republicans won all statewide elections in Vermont and most local and county elections as well.  Despite his party affiliation, he was well-enough regarded that he was elected to represent Underhill in the Vermont House of Representatives from 1890 to 1891, and served for many years as moderator of the Underhill town meeting and a Justice of the Peace.  From 1892 to 1896, Bullard was a special inspector of customs for the United States Department of the Treasury.

Continued career
For several years, Bullard was chairman of the Chittenden County Democratic Committee, and he served as a delegate to numerous state party conventions.  He was also an unsuccessful candidate for  Member of Congress from Vermont's 1st District (1894) and Chittenden County State's Attorney.

Bullard represented Burlington in the Vermont House from 1904 to 1905, and was credited with securing the appropriation that made possible the construction of Morrill Hall at the University of Vermont.  He was a delegate to the 1904 Democratic National Convention, and in 1906 he was the unsuccessful Democratic nominee for Vermont Attorney General.  Bullard served as Burlington's city attorney for several years, and from 1905 to 1913 he was a member of the city school board, including serving as chairman from 1909 to 1913.  In 1908, he was the Democratic nominee for United States Senator against incumbent Republican William P. Dillingham, and the Vermont General Assembly chose Dillingham by a vote of 230 to 38.

United States Attorney
In 1915, Bullard was appointed United States Attorney for the District of Vermont, succeeding Alexander Dunnett.  He served until 1923, and was succeeded by Harry B. Amey.

During Bullard's tenure, crimes that fell under federal jurisdiction were on the rise as the result of societal changes including increased urbanization, as well an increase in illegal activities connected to criminalizing the sale of opiates and cocaine, World War I, and passage of Prohibition in the United States.  As a result, Bullard's office handled as many as four times the cases of his predecessors, including draft evaders, drug dealers, and bootleggers.

Death and burial
Bullard died in Burlington on September 8, 1928.  He was buried in plot 5G-31 at Riverbank Cemetery in Stowe, Vermont.

Family
In 1885, Bullard married Fluella R. Stowe (1858-1894) of Morrisville.  She died in 1894, and they were the parents of two children, son Haven Stowe and daughter Augusta Ruth, the wife of Earle Benjamin of Plymouth, New Hampshire.  His second wife was Anniebel Stowe (1865-1925), a sister of his first wife.

References

Sources

Books

Newspapers

Internet

External links

Vernon A. Bullard at The Political Graveyard

1858 births
1928 deaths
People from Hyde Park, Vermont
People from Underhill, Vermont
Politicians from Burlington, Vermont
Johnson State College alumni
University of Michigan Law School alumni
Vermont lawyers
Democratic Party members of the Vermont House of Representatives
United States Attorneys for the District of Vermont
Burials in Vermont
19th-century American lawyers